Razmataz is a 2000 album, partly-animation DVD, and book by Italian jazz musician Paolo Conte. The album book and animation tell the story of Razmataz, a Harlem dancer and her troupe, in the Paris of the 1920s. Conte stated that "It is a story about the meeting between old Europe and young black music."

Track listing
"Razzmatazz" – 2:08
"Paris, les paris" – 2:30
"Guaracha" – 3:12
"La reine noire" – 1:41
"It's a green dream (1)" – 2:56
"Ça depend" – 2:09
"Talent scout man" – 3:18
"Aigrette et sa valse" – 1:34
"The yellow dog" – 3.13
"La danse" – 0:27
"The black Queen" – 4:37
"La java javanaise" – 2:28
"That's my opinion" – 2:10
"Guitars" – 1:42
"La petite tendresse" – 3:56
"Pasta "diva"" – 1:02
"It's a green dream (2)" – 3:49
"Mozambique fantasy (ouverture)" – 8:20

References

2000 albums